João Signorini (born 22 July 1977) is a Brazilian sailor. He competed in the Finn event at the 2004 Summer Olympics.

References

External links
 

1977 births
Living people
Brazilian male sailors (sport)
Olympic sailors of Brazil
Sailors at the 2004 Summer Olympics – Finn
Sportspeople from Rio de Janeiro (city)